The 1910 Upper Hunter state by-election was held on 13 April 1910 for the New South Wales Legislative Assembly electorate of Upper Hunter. The by-election was triggered by the resignation of William Fleming to unsuccessfully contest the federal seat of New England at the 1910 election.

The by-election and those for Darling Harbour and Queanbeyan were held on the same day as the 1910 Federal election.

Dates

Results

William Fleming resigned to unsuccessfully contest the federal seat of New England.

See also
Electoral results for the district of Upper Hunter
List of New South Wales state by-elections

Notes

References

New South Wales state by-elections
Upper Hunter
1910s in New South Wales